Type 37 may refer to:
 Bristol Type 37, British steam-powered passenger and airmail transport aircraft
 Bugatti Type 37, motor vehicle produced by the auto-maker Bugatti
 Peugeot Type 37, motor vehicle produced by the auto-maker Peugeot
 Type 037-II-class missile boat, missile equipped corvette built for the People's Liberation Army Navy
 Type 37 torpedo boat, class of warships built for Nazi Germany's Kriegsmarine